The Downtown West End is a neighbourhood within the western portions of downtown Calgary, Alberta, Canada. It is bounded to the north by the Bow River, to the east by 9th Street W, to the south by the CPR Tracks and to the west by 14th Street W.

West End is a high density residential community, largely made up of condominiums and apartment buildings, with only 25 single-family detached homes remaining in the neighbourhood.

Downtown Calgary was established as a neighbourhood in 1884, after the arrival of the Canadian Pacific Railway in 1883. It is represented in the Calgary City Council by the Ward 8 councillor, on a provincial level by Calgary-Buffalo MLA Kent Hehr, and at federal level by Calgary Centre MP Lee Richardson.

Attractions

The Shaw Millennium Park and Mewata Armouries are located in the western area of the neighbourhood, while paved multi-use (bicycle, walking, rollerblading, etc.) paths line the northern rim along the Bow River.

Contemporary Calgary, a public art gallery, is located in the building that previously housed the Centennial Planetarium and the Calgary Science Centre.

The Downtown West - Kerby C-Train station serves the community. Downtown West End is also well connected into the Plus 15 skywalk system.

Demographics

Residents in this community had a median household income of $47,964 in 2000, and there were 25.6% low income residents living in the neighbourhood. As of 2000, 20.2% of the residents were immigrants. A proportion of 93.4% of the buildings were condominiums or apartments, and 53.9% of the housing was used for renting.

See also
List of neighbourhoods in Calgary

References

Neighbourhoods in Calgary